Reynoso may refer to:

 21605 Reynoso, a minor planet
 Juan Reynoso (disambiguation)
 Alonso de Reinoso (1518–1567), Spanish Conquistador
 Yolanda Reynoso (born 1946), Mexican volleyball player